The 1980 UEFA Cup Final was a two-legged final, played on 7 May 1980 and 21 May 1980 to determine the champion of the 1979–80 UEFA Cup. The final pitted Eintracht Frankfurt of West Germany against Borussia Mönchengladbach, another West German side. Mönchengladbach were the holders, having won the competition's final the year prior.

Eintracht Frankfurt won on away goals after the tie ended 3–3 on aggregate.

Route to the final

This season of the UEFA Cup was unique in that all four teams that played in the semi-finals of the competition were clubs from the Bundesliga in West Germany – VfB Stuttgart, Bayern Munich, Eintracht Frankfurt, and Borussia Mönchengladbach.

Match details

First leg

Second leg

See also
1979–80 UEFA Cup
Eintracht Frankfurt in European football
German football clubs in European competitions

References
RSSSF

2
International club association football competitions hosted by Germany
Borussia Mönchengladbach matches
Eintracht Frankfurt matches
1980
Football in Frankfurt
1979–80 in German football
May 1980 sports events in Europe
1980 in West German sport
Sports competitions in Frankfurt
1980s in North Rhine-Westphalia
1980s in Frankfurt
Sports competitions in North Rhine-Westphalia
20th century in Mönchengladbach